Xantholinini is a tribe of rove beetle.

References

External links

 
Beetle tribes